Ferentari  is a neighbourhood located in the 5th Sector of Bucharest, Romania.

Etymology
The word "Ferentari" comes from the Latin word "Ferentarius" meaning "soldier in the old pedestrian army".

Area

Connections to the city center are relatively poor, because of the limited public transport available (see below) and because of the need to cross areas subject to frequent traffic jams like Chirigiu Square.

The borough stretches along Ferentarilor Avenue (Calea Ferentarilor) and the main boundaries are: Sălaj Road (Șoseaua Sălaj) and sometimes Rahovei Avenue (Calea Rahovei) to the South West, the industrial area, the railway and partially Progresului Road (to the South-East and East), and Sălaj Road (to the West). It is bordered by the Rahova, Pieptănări, and Giurgiului boroughs. These boundaries, being totally unofficial, are subject to individual interpretation.

History
Ferentari was the first modern industrial area of Bucharest developed in the middle of 19th century, when new industrial plants were built in the area and especially after the first railway in Romania was built (opened in 1869 and connecting Bucharest—via Filaret station—to Giurgiu). In 1947, the Ferentari Market housing estate was built, being the most modern (and last housing project) built during the era of the Kingdom of Romania. Between 1970 and 1978 multiple apartment buildings were constructed, including the infamous Aleea Livezilor buildings.

Population
The population of the neighbourhood is around 90,000. It has been assigned the lowest quota on local taxes (at the beginning of Calea Ferentarilor: B zone, the middle area: C zone, the rest: D zone).

Crime

It has a bad reputation—as being the worst borough in Bucharest as the base of drug dealers, prostitution, and mob operations in Bucharest. This is confirmed by the arrests of the Cămătaru mob clan, and police raids done in the Zabrăuți section of the borough after some drug-related incidents. As such, it is the center of drug dealing in Bucharest (for example, 45 dealers have been arrested in one police action) and has been the stage of a riot, a unique event in a city with very low crime rate.

However, Ferentari has a lower crime rate in terms of burglaries in relation to much of the city—possibly because of the poverty in the area. Areas such as Vadul Nou, Zăbrăuți, Prelungirea Ferentari, La Maici are notorious for squatting, and resorting to violence when they are served with eviction notices. Furthermore, when questioned about adequate responses to evictions, or to the police severing illegal connections to the mains, inhabitants of the neighbourhood consider violence as their main weapon, according to a sociological study by SNSPA.

In the said areas, the same article quotes that 84% of the inhabitants tap into the city's electricity grid, and 64% of the inhabitants have no access to sewage, because of their status as squatters, and their inability to sign contracts with the city. As such, the areas developed informal networks stealing power, water and even cable TV signal directly from the mains. An incident linked with disconnecting illegally connected electricity users sparked the revolt of 2006.

However, the bad situation is not limited to the areas above. Other areas, such as the Ferentari Avenue and Sălaj Road, are comparable in terms of both development and safety ratings with the rest of the city.

Transport
The area is served by the public transport (tramway and buses). Calea Ferentarilor prolonged by Prelungirea Ferentarilor is designed to be the connection of Bucharest to the Bucharest–Giurgiu highway.

Very little public transport serves the area (five bus lines and three tram lines compared to 11 tram lines, 22 bus lines and one trolleybus line in equally sized Rahova). Only one of the bus lines in the borough connects it with the city center, namely line 117 (the official route maps are available at ).

The future may, however, bring a sizable development of the area, as there is a lot of spare land around (practically the entire former industrial area which is down), available at low prices, close to the city center and excellent infrastructure, although unmaintained. Contributing for this are very low prices and taxes in the area.

References

External links

Map of the Ferentari area
Photos from Ferentari
 Ferentari – viata la puls de alerta part 1 and part 2
Ferentari in October 2011

Districts of Bucharest
Romani communities in Romania
Squatting